The 1959 Limerick Senior Hurling Championship was the 65th staging of the Limerick Senior Hurling Championship since its establishment by the Limerick County Board in 1887.

Claughaun were the defending champions.

Cappamore won the championship after a 2-08 to 0-04 defeat of St. Patrick's in the final. It was their fourth championship title overall and their first title in three years.

References

Limerick Senior Hurling Championship
Limerick Senior Hurling Championship